State Route 585 (SR 585) is a north–south (physically northeast-southwest) state highway in the northeastern portion of the U.S. state of Ohio.  The southern terminus of State Route 585 is at the SR 3/SR 83 concurrency in Wooster.  The northern terminus of this state route is an interchange with  SR 21 in Norton, where Wooster Road then continues to the northeast into Barberton.

Route description
The path of SR 585 takes it through the northeastern quadrant of Wayne County and just into the southwestern part of Summit County.  There are no segments of State Route 585 that are included as a part of the National Highway System, a network of highways deemed most important for the economy, mobility and defense of the country.

The Highway begins at an interchange with State Routes 3 and 83 at eastern Wooster. Much of State Route 585 is in a northeast-southwest direction, passing through towns such as Smithville. Towards State Route 21, the section of State Route 585 is more urban, passing through Easton and Doylestown. Here, State Route 585 has a brief concurrency with State Route 94, and also connects State Routes 57 and 604 before an interchange with State Route 21.

The interchange with SR 21 has an unusual configuration. It is a combination interchange with a left-hand flyover ramp from eastbound SR 585 to northbound SR 21. Eastbound Wooster Road just west of the interchange crosses the ramp from eastbound SR 585 to southbound SR 21 at-grade and merges with the loop ramp from southbound SR 21 to eastbound Wooster Road.

History
SR 585 was first designated in 1969. This designation replaced what was a portion of SR 5 up until that year, running from an interchange with SR 3 and what was then designated SR 76 (now SR 83) on the east side of Wooster northeasterly to an interchange with what was then US 21 (currently SR 21) in Norton. SR 585 has not experienced any major changes to its routing since its inception.

Major intersections

References

585
Transportation in Wayne County, Ohio
Transportation in Summit County, Ohio